Bernal District is one of six districts of the province of Sechura in Peru.

References